The Canal of the Angels (Italian: Il canale degli angeli) is a 1934 Italian drama film directed by Francesco Pasinetti and starring Maurizio D'Ancora, Anna Ariani and Ugo Gracci. The film is shot in semi-documentary style. In a poor neighborhood of Venice, a young boy becomes aware of his mother's adultery.

Along with a number of other films of the 1930s, it has elements which are a precursor to the emergence of Italian neorealism in the mid-1940s.

Cast
 Maurizio D'Ancora as Il 'Capitano' 
 Anna Ariani as Anna 
 Ugo Gracci as Daniele  
 Nina Simonetti as Gina  
 Aldo Rinaldi as Aldo  
 Pino Locchi as The Child 
 Mara Dussia
 Otello Toso

References

Bibliography 
 Brunetta, Gian Piero. The History of Italian Cinema: A Guide to Italian Film from Its Origins to the Twenty-first Century. Princeton University Press, 2009.

External links 
 

1934 films
Italian drama films
1934 drama films
1930s Italian-language films
Films set in Venice
Italian black-and-white films
1930s Italian films